Callionymus hindsii, Hinds' dragonet, is a species of dragonet native to the Indian Ocean and the western Pacific Ocean where it occurs at depths down to .  This species grows to a length of  TL. The specific name is thought to most likely to be in honour of the British naval surgeon, naturalist and writer Richard Brinsley Hinds (1811-1846).

References 

H
Fish described in 1844